Solomon Islands competed at the 2014 Summer Youth Olympics, in Nanjing, China from 16 August to 28 August 2014.

Athletics

Solomon Islands qualified one athletes.

Qualification Legend: Q=Final A (medal); qB=Final B (non-medal); qC=Final C (non-medal); qD=Final D (non-medal); qE=Final E (non-medal)

Girls
Track & road events

Triathlon

Solomon Islands was given a quota to compete by the tripartite committee.

Individual

Relay

Weightlifting

Solomon Islands was given a quota to compete in a girls' event by the tripartite committee.

Girls

References

2014 in Solomon Islands sport
Nations at the 2014 Summer Youth Olympics
Solomon Islands at the Youth Olympics